Lee Jung-eun (born January 23, 1970) is a South Korean actress. She is best known internationally for her role as the housekeeper Moon-gwang in the film Parasite, which won four Academy Awards and became the first non-English language film to win the award for Best Picture.

Career 
Lee Jeung-eun started out as theater play assistant director. After graduating from the Department of Theater and Film at Hanyang University she debuted in the play A Midsummer Night's Dream in 1991. In 2000, she made her big screen debut with minor role in the movie A Masterpiece In My Life. It was followed by another minor role, in 2001 film Wanee & Junah. Lee experienced camera fright and those cinematic acting experience traumatized her. Lee decided to go back onstage.

In 2000s, beside active in theater, Lee also made a living as an acting teacher. Two of her pupils were Ye Ji-won and Lee Eun-joo. On the recommendation of Professor Lee Hye-kyung, the head of the Department of Theater and Film at Kookmin University, Lee was introduced to Lee Hyo-ri, and became an acting teacher for her SBS drama role.

Her breakthrough as an actress was in the 2008 musical Laundry, one of most representatively creative musicals in Korea. Lee played multiple roles as a master, a grandmother, and an employee. Through this work, Lee received her first award, the Young Drama Awards (2008). She joined the musical Laundry again in 2009 and 2012. In addition to Laundry, she worked with director Choo Min-joo on the reading performances of ‘’House with Fig Trees’’ and Scars, as well as the musical Good Morning School.

Lee Jung-eun, who has gained a reputation in the musical field, decided to try film projects again. Costume director Choi Se-yeon, who was also the producer of the musical Laundry, recommended her for an audition. In 2009, Lee appeared in a minor role in Bong Joon-ho's film Mother. This marked her first collaboration with director Bong Joon-ho.

In 2014, Lee debuted in the television drama The Queen's Classroom. Lee Jung-eun drew attention from the public for her role as the Shaman of Seobinggo-dong in the tvN drama series Oh My Ghost (2015).

In 2017, Bong Joon-ho, already familiar with Lee in his film Mother (2009) offered her the "leading role" in the action-adventure film Okja. It was actually a job as the voice actor of a genetically modified pig named Okja. Lee decided to accept the role and worked hard researching for this role by visiting a pig farm. This marked her second collaboration with director Bong Joon-ho and featured an international cast, including Tilda Swinton and Paul Dano. Okja was screened in several independent theatres domestically, and released on streaming platform Netflix worldwide.

In 2019, Lee reunited with director Bong Joon-ho for the black comedy thriller film Parasite. Lee played the supporting character of Gook Moon-gwang, the Parkses' housekeeper, who also worked for the house's architect and previous owner of the house. Her acting skills were recognized for her role and she has won numerous awards, mostly in the supporting actress category, including the Busan Film Critics Association Award, Buil Film Award, Chunsa Film Award and Blue Dragon Film Award.

In 2022, Lee was cast as her first solo starring role in 30 years in Shin Su-won’s film Hommage. Lee acted as a middle-aged film director hitting a slump who time travels when she restores the film, The Female Judge, created by Hong Eun-won, the second Korean female director in the 1960s. It was released at the 23rd Jeonju IFF, which opened on April 28, 2022. On December 15, 2022, Lee won Best Actress at The 23rd Women’s Film Awards held at Cinecube Gwanghwamun in Seoul.

After winning the Best Jury Prize at the 20th Florence Korea Film Festival, the film was officially invited to the Viewpoints section of the 21st Tribeca Film Festival.

Lee has also won international accolades, such as The Best Actor Award of the 7th London East Asia Film Festival. The jury selected Lee as the award winner based on her depictions of desire, frustration, and the courage she displayed as a middle-aged woman whose dreams were delicately and realistically depicted by Lee in Hommage. Lee also won the Best Performance Award at the 15th Asia Pacific Screen Awards.

Filmography

Film

Television series

Web series

Stage

Musical

Theater

Awards and nominations

State honors

Notes

References

External links 
 
 
 
 Lee_Jung-eun at Play DB

1970 births
Living people
People from Seoul
Actresses from Seoul
South Korean television actresses
South Korean film actresses
South Korean stage actresses
South Korean musical theatre actresses
Hanyang University alumni
Outstanding Performance by a Cast in a Motion Picture Screen Actors Guild Award winners
20th-century South Korean actresses
21st-century South Korean actresses